Havré is a village of Wallonia and a district of the municipality of Mons, located in the province of Hainaut, Belgium.

It was a municipality until the fusion of the Belgian municipalities in 1977.

Etymology
The village's name would likely originate from the old name Haverec. However, etymologists are uncertain about the origin and meaning of the name. Some say it would mean Country of the hops, some other think it would mean cleared ground, and more recently a German line of thought associate it with a German word that could translate to wild ash tree.

Geography
Havré is a village situated at the confines of the Borinage and the Centre region. It is traversed by the Canal du Centre and the Haine river. It is situated next to Boussoit, Bray, Mons, Obourg, Saint-Symphorien, Ville-sur-Haine, and Villers-Saint-Ghislain.

Economy
Havré was a wealthy municipality from the 19th century to 1950, with forests, salt refinery, tannery, tabac fabric, gunpowder factory, glass factory, phosphate quarry, but mostly thanks to coal mines which employed more than a thousand people.

In 1960, after the last coal mine closed, the village became a commuter-town for people mainly working in Brussels, Mons, and Charleroi.

In the tertiary sector of the economy, Havré counts small and medium supermarkets, and there are retail and handicraft shops. Sport is also developed with infrastructure for tennis, football, and basketball.

Population 
 1837 : 1869 inhabitants
 1846 : 2043 inhabitants
 1860 : 1155 inhabitants
 1870 : 1915 inhabitants
 1910 : 3689 inhabitants
 1929 : 3713 inhabitants
 1961 : 5225 inhabitants
 1976 : 5390 inhabitants
 1990 : 5500 inhabitants
 2001 : 5930 inhabitants
 2004 : 5856 inhabitants
 2011 : 6157 inhabitants

Places
 Havré Castle
 Train station
 Place d’Havré (town square)
 Church Saint-Martin (on the town square)
 Priory of Saint-Antoine-in-Barbefosse
 Chapel of Bon-Vouloir (Good-will)

Gallery

External links

Sub-municipalities of Mons
Former municipalities of Hainaut (province)